Mudan is a railway station on the Taiwan Railways Administration Yilan line located in Shuangxi District, New Taipei, Taiwan.

History
The station was opened on 13 September 1922.

Structure 
The station that has two side platforms.

See also
 List of railway stations in Taiwan

References

1922 establishments in Taiwan
Railway stations in New Taipei
Railway stations opened in 1922
Railway stations served by Taiwan Railways Administration